The 2016–17 UCLA Bruins men's basketball team represented the University of California, Los Angeles during the 2016–17 NCAA Division I men's basketball season.  The Bruins were led by fourth-year head coach Steve Alford and played their home games at Pauley Pavilion as members in the Pac-12 Conference. They rode their offense to a 28–3 regular season record, averaging 91 points per game with a 53 percent field goal percentage. The talented squad featured five future players in the National Basketball Association (NBA), including three eventual first-round draft picks.

UCLA entered the season ranked No. 16 in the preseason.  After starting 13–0, the first time they were undefeated in non-conference play since they won a national championship in 1994–95, they moved up to No. 2 in the country. However, the Bruins suffered their first defeat in an 89–87 loss to No. 21 Oregon in the conference opener. UCLA won their next six games before losing at home to No. 14 Arizona for their first loss of the season at Pauley Pavilion. The Wildcats exposed the Bruins weaknesses on defense, which had to that point been obscured by their potent offense. They suffered their second consecutive defeat after falling to USC, who won for the fourth straight time in their crosstown rivalry. They won their last nine games of the regular season to tie the school record for most regular season wins.

The Bruins struggled uncharacteristically with their offense during the  Pac-12 tournament. They beat USC 76–74 while shooting just 41.2 percent before shooting a season-low 40.7 percent in an 86–75 loss to Arizona in the semifinals. UCLA entered the NCAA tournament as a third seed in the South region. They advanced to the Sweet Sixteen for the third time in four years, where they lost 86–75 to Kentucky.

Previous season

The Bruins finished the season 15–17 overall; and 6–12 in the conference. During the season, the Bruins were invited and participated in the Maui Invitational in Maui, Hawaii. UCLA defeated Cal Poly and UNLV but lost against Kansas and Wake Forest to earn 4th place. UCLA also lost to North Carolina in the CBS Sports Classic in Brooklyn, New York. In the postseason, the Bruins lost to USC in the first round of the 2016 Pac-12 Conference men's basketball tournament in Paradise, Nevada.

Off-season

Departures

2016 recruiting class

Roster

 Guard Prince Ali out since July with a torn meniscus. In early January, Ali decided to redshirt for the 2016–17 season.
 Forward Alex Olesinski out since early November with left foot injury. In early January, Olesinski decided to redshirt for the 2016–17 season.
 Oct 25, 2016 – Forward/Center Ike Anigbogu out 4–6 weeks with torn meniscus in right knee. Made return at Nov. 25 game against Nebraska.

Schedule

|-
!colspan=12 style=""| Australia Tour

|-
!colspan=12 style=""| Exhibition

|-
!colspan=12 style=""| Non-conference regular season

|-
!colspan=12 style=";"| 

|-
!colspan=12 style=";"| 

|-
!colspan=12 style=";"|

Rankings

*AP does not release post-NCAA tournament rankings

Player statistics

Notes
 Dec. 21, 2016 – First time a UCLA team went undefeated in non-conference play since the 1994–95 season
 March 24, 2017 – Ball told reporters after the Regional semi-final game that he will not return next season to play for the Bruins

Honors

Preseason award watchlists
 Lonzo Ball – Bob Cousy Award Watchlist
 Isaac Hamilton – Jerry West Award Watchlist
 T. J. Leaf – Karl Malone Award Watchlist
 Thomas Welsh – Kareem Abdul-Jabbar Award Watchlist

Midseason awards
 Lonzo Ball – Wooden Legacy MVP (Nov. 27)
 Lonzo Ball – Pac-12 Player of the Week (Nov. 28)
 T. J. Leaf – Pac-12 Player of the Week (Dec. 5)
 T. J. Leaf – Pac-12 Player of the Week (Dec. 19)
 Bryce Alford – Pac-12 Player of the Week (Jan. 16)
 Lonzo Ball – Pac-12 Player of the Week (Feb. 13)

Postseason awards
Lonzo Ball - Unanimous first-team All-American
 First-team All-Pac-12: Bryce Alford, Lonzo Ball and T. J. Leaf
Lonzo Ball - Wayman Tisdale Award

References

UCLA Bruins men's basketball seasons
Ucla
Ucla
UCLA
UCLA